St Pancras Church is a  Greek Revival church in St Pancras, London, built in 1819–22 to the designs of William and Henry William Inwood. The church is one of the most important 19th-century churches in England and is a Grade I listed building.

Location
The church is on the northern boundary of Bloomsbury, on the south side of Euston Road, at the corner of Upper Woburn Place, in the borough of Camden.  When it was built its west front faced into the south-east corner of  Euston Square, which had been laid out on either side of what was then simply known as the "New Road". It was intended as a new principal church for the parish of St Pancras, which once stretched almost from Oxford Street to Highgate. The original parish church was small ancient building to the north of  New Road. This had become neglected  following a shift in population to the north, and by the early 19th century services were only held there once a month, worship at other times taking place in a chapel in Kentish Town. With the northwards expansion of London into the area, the population in southern part  of the parish grew once more, and a new church was felt necessary. Following the opening of the new Church, the Old Church became a chapel of ease, although it was later given its own separate parish. During the 19th century many further churches were built to serve the burgeoning population of the original parish of St Pancras, and by 1890 it had been divided into 33 ecclesiastical parishes.

History

The Church was built primarily to serve the newly built up areas close to Euston Road, especially parts of the well-to-do district of  Bloomsbury. The building of St Pancras church  was agreed in 1816. After a competition involving thirty or so tenders, designs by the local architect William Inwood, in collaboration with his son Henry William Inwood, were accepted. The builder was Isaac Seabrook. The first stone was laid by the  Duke of York at a  ceremony on 1 July 1819. It was carved with a Greek inscription, of which the English translation was   "May the light of the blessed Gospel thus ever illuminate the dark temples of the Heathen".

The church was consecrated by the Bishop of London on 7 May 1822, and the sermon was preached by the vicar of St Pancras, James Moore. The total cost of the building, including land and furnishings, was £76,679, making it the most expensive church to be built in London since the rebuilding of St Paul's Cathedral. It was designed to seat 2,500 people.

Architecture
The church is in a Greek revival style, using the Ionic order.

The Inwoods drew on two ancient Greek monuments, the Erechtheum and the Tower of the Winds, both in Athens, for their inspiration. The doorways are closely modelled on those of the Erechtheum, as is the entablature, and much of the other ornamentation.  Henry William Inwood  was in Athens  at the time that the plans for St Pancras were accepted, and brought plaster casts of  details of the Erechtheum, and some excavated fragments, back to England.

The west end follows the basic arrangement of portico, vestibules and tower established by James Gibbs at St Martin-in-the-Fields. The octagonal domed ceiling of the vestibule is in imitation of the Tower of the Winds, and the tower above uses details from the same structure. At the east end is an apse, flanked by the church's most original features: two tribunes designed in imitation of the Erechtheum, with entablatures supported by caryatids. Unlike those on the Erechtheum, each caryatid holds a symbolic extinguished torch or an empty jug, appropriate for their positions above the entrances to the burial vault. There is a stone sarcophagus behind the figures in each tribune, and the cornices are studded with lion's heads. The caryatids are made of terracotta, constructed in sections around cast-iron columns, and were modelled by John Charles Felix Rossi,  who provided all the terracotta on the building. The upper levels of the tribunes were designed as vestries.

Access to the church is through three doorways ranged under the portico. There are no side doors. The interior of the apse is in the form of one half of a circular temple, with six columns, painted to imitate marble, raised on a plinth.

The crypt, which extends the whole length of the church, was designed to  contain  2,000 coffins, but fewer than five hundred interments had taken place by  1854, when the practice was ended in all London churches. It served as an air-raid shelter in both world wars and is now used as an art gallery.

The church was closed for two years from 1951 for structural renovation made necessary by dry rot and war damage. The North Chapel was added in 1970 and the interior was restored in 1981. The steps of the church were one of several sites used for floral tributes after the 7 July 2005 London bombings. The building in Grade I listed.

Today
St Pancras is still in use as a place of worship. The Revd Anne Stevens is the current Vicar. In addition to its regular services it regularly hosts civic services, concerts and talks. Art exhibitions are held in the crypt (www.cryptgallery.org.uk). The London Festival of Contemporary Church Music was established at St Pancras in 2002, and continues (2022) to be based there.

Gallery

References

Sources

External links

Official site
Most recent Mystery Worshipper Report at the Ship of Fools website

Churches completed in 1822
19th-century Church of England church buildings
Church of England church buildings in the London Borough of Camden
Grade I listed churches in London
Diocese of London
Greek Revival church buildings in the United Kingdom
Buildings and structures in Bloomsbury
Anglo-Catholic church buildings in the London Borough of Camden
St Pancras, London
1822 establishments in England